Mandalit Del Barco is an arts and culture reporter for National Public Radio (NPR). A fourth generation journalist, she was born in Lima, Peru to a Peruvian father and a Mexican-American mother.  Her stories are featured on all NPR shows, including All Things Considered, Morning Edition, and  Weekend Edition.  Del Barco has also been published in numerous anthologies.

After studying Anthropology and Rhetoric at U.C. Berkeley and writing for The Daily Californian, she earned her Masters in journalism at Columbia University, where she wrote her masters thesis entitled “Breakdancers; Who Are They and Why are They Spinning On Their Heads?”
She continued her career as a journalist for The Miami Herald and also spent time working for The Village Voice. She first began working in radio while in New York.  She moved to Los Angeles in 1993 from New York City, where she was a reporter for WNYC. She has lived in Los Angeles since 1993, and is a correspondent NPR News.

Del Barco was raised in Oakland, California and has referred to it as her home town in interviews.  She spent the year of 1999–2000 living and working in her native Peru as a Fulbright Fellow and on a fellowship with the Knight International Centre for Journalists. While there she worked on a documentary project about the rise and fall of Alberto Fujimori as well as gathering the stories of those internally displaced during Peru's internal conflicts.

Del Barco has had tremendous influence on many up-and-coming journalists. She has been a student mentor on all of the National Association of Hispanic Journalists (NAHJ) and Unity student projects as well as mentoring young journalists outside this venue. At its 2015 annual conference, the National Council of La Raza (NCLR) presented Del Barco with the Ruben Salazar Award for Communications, citing among her achievements, her "empowering young female journalists".

In 2012, she was chosen by the public as having the "Best Name In Public Radio" according to a poll conducted by NPR.

References

External links
 NPR biography

Living people
NPR personalities
Peruvian emigrants to the United States
American people of Mexican descent
Year of birth missing (living people)